Wilson Butte Cave is located on the Snake River plain in Jerome County northeast of Twin Falls and southeast of Shoshone, Idaho. Listed on the National Register of Historic Places as an archeological site, it is maintained by the Bureau of Land Management (BLM).

A round bubble in appearance, it pops up from a flat wide bed of ancient basalt lava. An inflationary or uplift cave is inside the bubble. While archeologists are uncertain of exact dates prior to 10,000 years ago, evidence has been found that native peoples lived at Wilson Butte Cave at least 10,000 years ago. Artifacts found here provide the oldest evidence of human presence on the Snake River Plain and are among the oldest such evidence in all of North America. Archeologists are fairly certain that the reason the cave was settled so early is that it was used as a base from which to hunt bison. Strong connections have been found to the Fremont culture and the Shoshone people, who lived there after the Fremont peoples. Vegetation in the region was very similar to modern times. Camels and giant ground sloths once roamed this region. Deposits here are believed to have been undisturbed until amateurs discovered them in 1958. Two of the major excavations of the cave were conducted by teams led by Ruth Gruhn; one in 1959–1960 and one in 1988–1989. Gruhn dates the site's earliest occupation to 14,000–15,000 years ago.

The lava of the area is a dark gray to black fine-grained basalt. The cave is a lava tube developed in a pressure ridge in the flowing lava. The source of the lava is Wilson's Butte, which is about one half mile southeast of the cave. The lava is more than 15,000 years old, as determined by radiocarbon dating of a camel bone from within a lava tube cave. The bone had tool markings indicating working by humans.

See also
 National Register of Historic Places listings in Jerome County, Idaho

References

Further reading
 Ruth Gruhn. The Archaeology of Wilson Butte Cave, South-central Idaho. Occasional papers 6. Pocatello: Idaho State College Museum, 1961. 
 Ruth Gruhn. New excavations at Wilson Butte Cave, South-central Idaho. Idaho Museum of Natural History occasional paper 38. Pocatello: Idaho State Museum of Natural History, 2006.

External links

Visit Idaho - Wilson Butte Cave



Archaeological sites on the National Register of Historic Places in Idaho
Bureau of Land Management areas in Idaho
Caves of Idaho
Landforms of Jerome County, Idaho
Lava tubes
Protected areas of Jerome County, Idaho
National Register of Historic Places in Jerome County, Idaho